Iniistius verrens, the three banded razorfish or blue razor wrasse, is a species of marine ray-finned fish 
from the family Labridae, the wrasses., It is found in the Northwest Pacific, including Japan and Taiwan.

References

verrens
Taxa named by David Starr Jordan
Taxa named by Barton Warren Evermann
Fish described in 1902